A Markov number or Markoff number is a positive integer x, y or z that is part of a solution to the Markov Diophantine equation

The first few Markov numbers are

1, 2, 5, 13, 29, 34, 89, 169, 194, 233, 433, 610, 985, 1325, ... 

appearing as coordinates of the Markov triples

(1, 1, 1), (1, 1, 2), (1, 2, 5), (1, 5, 13), (2, 5, 29), (1, 13, 34), (1, 34, 89), (2, 29, 169), (5, 13, 194), (1, 89, 233), (5, 29, 433), (1, 233, 610), (2, 169, 985), (13, 34, 1325), ...

There are infinitely many Markov numbers and Markov triples.

Markov tree 
There are two simple ways to obtain a new Markov triple from an old one (x, y, z). First, one may permute the 3 numbers x,y,z, so in particular one can normalize the triples so that x ≤ y ≤ z. Second, if (x, y, z) is a Markov triple then by Vieta jumping so is (x, y, 3xy − z). Applying this operation twice returns the same triple one started with. Joining each normalized Markov triple to the 1, 2, or 3 normalized triples one can obtain from this gives a graph starting from (1,1,1) as in the diagram. Starting with that same triplet and trading x and z before each iteration gives the triples with Pell numbers.

All the Markov numbers on the regions adjacent to 2's region are odd-indexed Pell numbers (or numbers n such that 2n2 − 1 is a square), and all the Markov numbers on the regions adjacent to 1's region are odd-indexed Fibonacci numbers. Thus, there are infinitely many Markov triples of the form

where Fk is the kth Fibonacci number. Likewise, there are infinitely many Markov triples of the form

where Pk is the kth Pell number.

Proof that this generates all possible triples

Start with some solution (x, y, z), and assume all three are distinct. Now consider the quadratic 

Note that z is a root. By Vieta jumping, the other root z′ satisfies z + z′ = 3xy and zz′ = x&hairsp;2 + y&hairsp;2. Thus since z is positive, z′ is also positive, we see that z′ = 3xy − z gives another solution. 

Now, WLOG, assume x > y, then take 

Since y > 0, 2 − 3y ≤ −1, so f(x) < 0. Since f(t) is an upward-facing parabola, that means min(z, z′&hairsp;) < x < max(z, z′&hairsp;). 

That means that we can construct three new solutions: (x, y, 3xy − z), (x, 3xz − y, z), and (3yz − x, y, z) and these are distinct.  By our calculation above, exactly one of the three new solutions will have a smaller maximum element than (x, y, z) (and the other two larger).

Thus we proceed in this way, reducing the maximum element each time (which is the essence of Vieta jumping). Since we are working with only positive integers, we must eventually stop, which means we reach a solution that has not all elements distinct.

It's left for us to consider such a solution. WLOG assume x = y, then 2x2 + z2 = 3x2z. Thus x2 | z2 and x | z, so write z = ax. So we get 

So we see a|2 so a = 1 or 2. If a = 1 then we get (1, 1, 1) and if a = 2 then we get (1, 1, 2). And from (1, 1, 2) we get to (1, 1, 1) by taking (x, y, 3xy − z).
	
Thus we see that starting from an arbitrary solution we eventually come to (1, 1, 1), and so these are all the solutions.

Other properties
Aside from the two smallest singular triples (1, 1, 1) and (1, 1, 2), every Markov triple consists of three distinct integers.

The unicity conjecture states that for a given Markov number c, there is exactly one normalized solution having c as its largest element: proofs of this conjecture have been claimed but none seems to be correct.

Odd Markov numbers are 1 more than multiples of 4, while even Markov numbers are 2 more than multiples of 32.

In his 1982 paper, Don Zagier conjectured that the nth Markov number is asymptotically given by

The error  is plotted below.

The conjecture was proved  by Greg McShane and Igor Rivin in 1995 using techniques from hyperbolic geometry.

The nth Lagrange number can be calculated from the nth Markov number with the formula

The Markov numbers are sums of (non-unique) pairs of squares.

Markov's theorem
 showed that if

is an indefinite binary quadratic form with real coefficients and discriminant , then there are integers x, y for which f takes a nonzero value of absolute value at most

unless f is a Markov form: a constant times a form

such that

where (p, q, r) is a Markov triple.

Matrices
Let Tr denote the trace function over matrices. If X and Y are in SL2(ℂ), then

Tr(X) Tr(Y) Tr(X⋅Y) + Tr(X⋅Y⋅X −1⋅Y −1) + 2 = Tr(X)2 + Tr(Y)2 + Tr(X⋅Y)2

so that if Tr(X⋅Y⋅X −1⋅Y −1) = −2 then

 Tr(X) Tr(Y) Tr(X⋅Y) = Tr(X)2 + Tr(Y)2 + Tr(X⋅Y)2

In particular if X and Y also  have integer entries then Tr(X)/3, Tr(Y)/3, and Tr(X⋅Y)/3 are a Markov triple. If X⋅Y⋅Z = I then Tr(X⋅Y) = Tr(Z), so more symmetrically if X, Y, and Z are in SL2(ℤ) with X⋅Y⋅Z = I and the commutator of two of them has trace −2, then their traces/3 are a Markov triple.

See also
Markov spectrum

Notes

References
 
 
 
 
 
 
 

Diophantine equations
Diophantine approximation
Fibonacci numbers